David Elias Callaham (born October 24th, 1977) is an American screenwriter and producer.

Life
Callaham was born in Fresno, California on October 24, 1977 to Lee Hsu and Michael Callaham. He has a brother, Gregory. He is of Chinese descent through his mother. He studied English at the University of Michigan and graduated in 1999. In 2009, Callaham married Bree Tichy. They have at least one child. He is a Brown Belt in 10th Planet Jiu-Jitsu under Eddie Bravo.

Career 
After reading an article in Penthouse magazine focusing on the lifestyle of Hollywood TV writers, Callaham and a friend moved to Los Angeles with plans to write comedies together. They sent query letters to multiple agencies but never received responses. Callaham worked at Creative Artists Agency for a while, sometimes submitting his material secretly for coverage. In 2003, Callaham wrote the film adaptation to the video game Doom and submitted it in the summer of 2005. Around that time, Callaham wrote Barrow for Warner Bros., a mercenary-inspired action script which later became The Expendables. Callaham was credited for story and characters after Sylvester Stallone used Callaham's Barrow script as a "starting point" for The Expendables. In 2010, Legendary Pictures hired Callaham to write the first draft for Godzilla, for which he received a story credit. In 2014, Callaham completed a production rewrite for Ant-Man, and in 2019, he co-wrote the Zombieland sequel, Zombieland: Double Tap, for Sony. He also worked on the yet-unproduced Jackpot for Focus Features and America: The Motion Picture for Netflix.

In October 2016, Universal Pictures hired Callaham to rewrite The Wolf Man for their Dark Universe. In September 2017, Patty Jenkins hired Callaham to write the script for Wonder Woman 1984 with her and Geoff Johns. In November 2018, Sony Pictures Animation hired Callaham to write a sequel to Spider-Man: Into the Spider-Verse. The following month, Marvel Studios hired Callaham to write the screenplay for a film based on Shang-Chi. The film was released on August 16, 2021. In April 2020, Callaham was announced as the writer of Walt Disney Pictures' live-action remake of Hercules. In June 2022, it was reported that he left the project. In January 2022, Callaham was announced to written the latest draft of screenplay of the Masters of the Universe reboot for Netflix, along with Aaron and Adam Nee.

Lawsuit
In late 2013, Nu Image and Millennium Films filed a lawsuit against Callaham and the Writers Guild of America West for fraud, unjust enrichment, and declaratory relief over a "flawed and misinformed" Guild arbitration that gave Callaham undeserved writing credit for The Expendables and The Expendables 2.

The plaintiffs accused Callaham of intentionally withholding emails and other correspondences from the WGA screenwriting credit arbitration panel in 2009 that reportedly reveal how very little Callaham was involved with The Expendables. They demanded reimbursements from Callaham for any payments made to him for his fradulent credit in the two films. Callaham then asserted that Sylvester Stallone used his script, Barrow, as the source for The Expendables. A WGA arbitration was ignited in which Callaham won and additionally earned $102,250 in bonus payments. Stallone offered a sworn declaration that attested he had used Barrow as inspiration for his Expendables script.

Filmography

Films

Television

References

External links

 

American male screenwriters
American people of Chinese descent
Living people
1977 births
Writers from Fresno, California
University of Michigan College of Literature, Science, and the Arts alumni
Screenwriters from California
Sony Pictures Animation people